In biochemistry, steady state refers to the maintenance of constant internal concentrations of molecules and ions in the cells and organs of living systems.  Living organisms remain at a dynamic steady state where their internal composition at both cellular and gross levels are relatively constant, but different from equilibrium concentrations. A continuous flux of mass and energy results in the constant synthesis and breakdown of molecules via chemical reactions of biochemical pathways. Essentially, steady state can be thought of as homeostasis at a cellular level.

Maintenance of steady state 

Metabolic regulation achieves a balance between the rate of input of a substrate and the rate that it is degraded or converted, and thus maintains steady state. The rate of metabolic flow, or flux, is variable and subject to metabolic demands. However, in a metabolic pathway, steady state is maintained by balancing the rate of substrate provided by a previous step and the rate that the substrate is converted into product, keeping substrate concentration relatively constant.

Thermodynamically speaking, living organisms are open systems, meaning that they constantly exchange matter and energy with their surroundings. A constant supply of energy is required for maintaining steady state, as maintaining a constant concentration of a molecule preserves internal order and thus is entropically unfavorable. When a cell dies and no longer utilizes energy, its internal composition will proceed toward equilibrium with its surroundings.

In some occurrences, it is necessary for cells to adjust their internal composition in order to reach a new steady state. Cell differentiation, for example, requires specific protein regulation that allows the differentiating cell to meet new metabolic requirements.

ATP 
The concentration of ATP must be kept above equilibrium level so that the rates of ATP-dependent biochemical reactions meet metabolic demands. A decrease in ATP will result in a decreased saturation of enzymes that use ATP as substrate, and thus a decreased reaction rate. The concentration of ATP is also kept higher than that of AMP,  and a decrease in the ATP/AMP ratio triggers AMPK to activate cellular processes that will return ATP and AMP concentrations to steady state.

In one step of the glycolysis pathway catalyzed by PFK-1, the equilibrium constant of reaction is approximately 1000, but the steady state concentration of products (fructose-1,6-bisphosphate and ADP) over reactants (fructose-6-phosphate and ATP) is only 0.1, indicating that the ratio of ATP to AMP remains in a steady state significantly above equilibrium concentration.  Regulation of PFK-1 maintains ATP levels above equilibrium.

In the cytoplasm of hepatocytes, the steady state ratio of NADP+ to NADPH is approximately 0.1 while that of NAD+ to NADH is approximately 1000, favoring NADPH as the main reducing agent and NAD+ as the main oxidizing agent in chemical reactions.

Blood glucose 

Blood glucose levels are maintained at a steady state concentration by balancing the rate of entry of glucose into the blood stream (i.e. by ingestion or released from cells) and the rate of glucose uptake by body tissues. Changes in the rate of input will be met with a change in consumption, and vice versa, so that blood glucose concentration is held at about 5 mM in humans. A change in blood glucose levels triggers the release of insulin or glucagon, which stimulates the liver to release glucose into the bloodstream or take up glucose from the bloodstream in order to return glucose levels to steady state. Pancreatic beta cells, for example, increase oxidative metabolism as a result of a rise in blood glucose concentration, triggering secretion of insulin. Glucose levels in the brain are also maintained at steady state, and glucose delivery to the brain relies on the balance between the flux of the blood brain barrier and uptake by brain cells. In teleosts, a drop of blood glucose levels below that of steady state decreases the intracellular-extracellular gradient in the bloodstream, limiting glucose metabolism in red blood cells.

Blood lactate 
Blood lactate levels are also maintained at steady state. At rest or low levels of exercise, the rate of lactate production in muscle cells and consumption in muscle or blood cells allows lactate to remain in the body at a certain steady state concentration. If a higher level of exercise is sustained, however, blood lactose levels will increase before becoming constant, indicating that a new steady state of elevated concentration has been reached. Maximal lactate steady state (MLSS) refers to the maximum constant concentration of lactase reached during sustained high-activity.

Nitrogen-containing molecules 
Metabolic regulation of nitrogen-containing molecules, such as amino acids, is also kept at steady state. The amino acid pool, which describes the level of amino acids in the body, is maintained at a relatively constant concentration by balancing the rate of input (i.e. from dietary protein ingestion, production of metabolic intermediates) and rate of depletion (i.e. from formation of body proteins, conversion to energy-storage molecules). Amino acid concentration in lymph node cells, for example, is kept at steady state with active transport as the primary source of entry, and diffusion as the source of efflux.

Ions 

One main function of plasma and cell membranes is to maintain asymmetric concentrations of inorganic ions in order to maintain an ionic steady state different from electrochemical equilibrium. In other words, there is a differential distribution of ions on either side of the cell membrane - that is, the amount of ions on either side is not equal and therefore a charge separation exists. However, ions move across the cell membrane such that a constant resting membrane potential is achieved; this is ionic steady state. In the pump-leak model of cellular ion homeostasis, energy is utilized to actively transport ions against their electrochemical gradient. The maintenance of this steady state gradient, in turn, is used to do electrical and chemical work, when it is dissipated though the passive movement of ions across the membrane.

In cardiac muscle, ATP is used to actively transport sodium ions out of the cell through a membrane ATPase. Electrical excitation of the cell results in an influx of sodium ions into the cell, temporarily depolarizing the cell. To restore the steady state electrochemical gradient, ATPase removes sodium ions and restores potassium ions in the cell. When an elevated heart rate is sustained, causing more depolarizations, sodium levels in the cell increase until becoming constant, indicating that a new steady state has been reached.

See also 
 Transition state
 Steady state
 Steady state (chemistry)

References 

Biochemistry
Physical chemistry